Donald B. Jenkins (born November 5, 1977), better known as Dizzle and Baby D, is an underground rapper from Atlanta. His first album, Off Da Chain, was released in 2000 on Big Oomp Records. Two years later his follow up, Lil' Chopper Toy was released. A major label bidding war ensued, garnering the young MC a multimillion-dollar deal with Epic Records. He was signed with Koch Records, and released his first mainstream album, A-Town Secret Weapon, on April 29, 2008. Three years later, in 2011, Baby D signed with Mizay Entertainment.

In March 2012, Baby D changed his stage name to Dizzle. On November 1, 2012, he released his third independent album entitled About My Grind. He also created his own label, AMG, or Alliance Music Group.

Personal life

Legal issues 
Jenkins was arrested in March 2008 for assault and cocaine trafficking. Federal charges, as well as warrants in Georgia and Tennessee, ultimately led to his arrest in Butler County, Ohio. Contrary to these allegations, Jenkins claimed in a 2010 interview with hiphopbeef.com that his trust and involvement with the wrong people led to the consequence of imprisonment. He was released from prison in 2010, and remained on house arrest until late 2011.

Discography

Studio albums

Independent albums

Singles

As a lead artists

As a featured artist

Guest appearances 
 1995: "Thangs Change" (Too $hort featuring Mali, Jamal from Illegal & Baby D)
 1996: "Baby D" (Too $hort featuring Baby D)
 2002: "Who U Is" (Rasheeda featuring Baby D, 404 Soldierz & Noodoz)
 2004: "Drama!" (DJ Kay Slay featuring Lil Jon, Bun B, David Banner & Baby D)
 2004: "We Ain't Playin" (Lil' Flip featuring Killer Mike, Baby D & Pastor Troy)
 2007: "Hit The Dance Floor Remix" (Unk featuring Baby D)
 2007: "Hold On Ho!" (Unk featuring Baby D & Parlae of Dem Franchize Boyz)
 2009: "Air Forces Remix" (Young Jeezy featuring Baby D)
 2009: "I'm a Boss" (Young Jeezy featuring Bleu Davinci & Baby D)

Music videos 
 2000: "Eastside vs Westside" (featuring Lil' C)
 2003: "It's Going Down" (featuring Bone Crusher & Dru)
 2007: "Hit The Dance Floor Remix" (Unk featuring Baby D)
 2007: "I'm Bout Money" (featuring Blazed)
 2007: "Do It"
 2010: "Here We Go Again"
 2010: "Lock Down"
 2012: "One Night Sum" (featuring Gucci Mane)
 2012: "Here We Go"

References

External links 

 https://hotspotatl.com/3542505/baby-d-and-lil-c-talk-eastside-vs-westside-oomp-camp-bmf-with-black-da-dealer/

1977 births
Living people
African-American male rappers
American male rappers
American music industry executives
Businesspeople from Georgia (U.S. state)
Prisoners and detainees of Georgia (U.S. state)
Rappers from Atlanta
Southern hip hop musicians
21st-century American rappers
21st-century American male musicians
21st-century African-American musicians
20th-century African-American people